Aroi (also Aroe) is a neighbourhood in the city of Patras, Achaea, Greece.

Aroi in ancient Greek means "fertile land". The district is one of the most populous in the area.

References

Neighborhoods in Patras